Crossley v Faithful & Gould Holdings Ltd [2004] EWCA Civ 293 is an English contract law case, concerning implied terms.

Facts
Mr Crossley was a director of Faithful & Gould Ltd. He suffered a nervous breakdown. Under the firm’s disability insurance scheme, so long as he was an employee he was entitled to benefits while totally unable to work. He tendered his resignation in terms suggested by Faithful Ltd. Unfortunately that terminated his right to benefits. The scheme insurer stopped payments after one year. Was there an ‘implied term of any contract of employment that the employer will take reasonable care for the economic well being of his employee'?

Judgment
Dyson LJ, for terms implied in law one should not ‘focus on the elusive concept of necessity’ which is ‘somewhat protean’ but should ‘recognise that, to some extent at least, the existence and scope of standardised implied terms raise questions of reasonableness, fairness and the balancing of competing policy considerations.’ But it was inappropriate to imply such a broad term, and ‘such an implied term would impose an unfair and unreasonable burden on employers.’ Their interests conflict with employees so it is unreasonable for employers ‘to have regard to the employee’s financial circumstances when he takes lawful business decisions which may affect the employee’s economic welfare.’ The employer does not need to ‘act as his employee’s financial adviser.’ So there were ‘no obvious policy reasons to impose on an employer the general duty to protect his employee’s economic well-being.’?

Sir Andrew Morrit VC, Thomas LJ concurred.

See also
Scally v Southern Health and Social Services Board [1992] 1 AC 294
Equitable Life Assurance Society v Hyman [2002] 1 AC 408
Attorney General of Belize v Belize Telecom Ltd

Notes

References

English contract case law
United Kingdom labour case law
Court of Appeal (England and Wales) cases
2004 in case law
2004 in British law